Candace Mycale "Mickey" Guyton June 17, 1983) (born 17 June 1983) is an American country music artist. Raised in Texas, Guyton was exposed to various types of music at a young age, and her material subsequently incorporates elements of contemporary country and R&B music. Moving to Nashville, Tennessee in 2011, she would later sign a recording contract with Capitol Records Nashville. In 2015, the label released Guyton's debut extended play (EP), Unbreakable.

In 2015, Capitol released her debut single, titled "Better Than You Left Me". The song reached number 34 on the US Country Airplay chart and helped her receive a nomination from the Academy of Country Music Awards. The same year, her second self-titled EP was released. In 2020, Guyton released the single "Black Like Me", which speaks to her experiences as a Black woman, particularly a Black woman in country music. It was released in the wake of the George Floyd protests and the Black Lives Matter movement. The song helped further elevate Guyton's career and resulted in her first ever nomination at the Grammy Awards, becoming the first Black woman to ever be nominated in the Best Country Solo Performance category. Later that year, her third extended play Bridges was released. She then collaborated with Dean Brody on the song "Boys" which made her the first Black woman to achieve a number one hit on the Canada Country chart. Her debut album Remember Her Name followed in 2021. Guyton's music is defined by country, pop, and R&B influences.

Early life
Guyton was born in Arlington, Texas, the second oldest of four children born to Phyllis Ann Roddy and Michael Eugene Guyton. Her family moved throughout the state during her childhood, due to her father's job as an engineer. She was initially enrolled in a local public school, but faced racial discrimination from other families in the neighborhood and was subsequently moved to a private school. Despite this change, Guyton continued to experience racism, stating in a 2020 interview with NPR that her best friends' parents would often refer to her with racial slurs.

Guyton also began singing as a child and developed an interest in music around five years old. She often performed in church choirs, notably at the Mount Olive Baptist Church in Arlington. She was inspired to begin a singing career after she saw LeAnn Rimes sing "The Star-Spangled Banner" at the start of a Texas Rangers game. She moved to Los Angeles, California after graduating high school to pursue country music professionally while attending Santa Monica College. She studied business and also worked several minimum wage jobs to support herself. Several of the jobs included work as a background vocalist, including an appearance singing in Nick Cannon's film Underclassman. Additionally, she sang on demonstration records and auditioned for American Idol. Guyton's American Idol audition was cut just before the live shows for the top 24, and she appeared only briefly on television during her final singing performance of the audition rounds.

Career

2011–2015: Early career and "Better Than You Left Me"
After moving to Los Angeles, Guyton met record producer Julian Raymond. Impressed by her singing voice, he introduced her to country music industry professionals Gary Borman and Steve Moir. Both men helped launch the music careers of country artists such as Faith Hill and Keith Urban. The initial meetings with Borman and Moir prompted her to move to Nashville, Tennessee in 2011. Guyton soon became part of the city's country music songwriting community. The same year, Guyton had the opportunity to audition for UMG Nashville's chairman, Mike Dungan. Singing a song by Patty Loveless, she was then signed to UMG's Capitol Records Nashville division. With her signing, she became the genre's only black female artist signed to a major label. Among her first events following her label signing was an all-star performance at the White House, where she performed alongside Kris Kristofferson, Lyle Lovett, Darius Rucker and James Taylor.

As she developed her artistry, Guyton was warned by industry professionals that she would be unsuccessful if went outside traditional country music boundaries: "Make sure your songs sound really country because listeners might think you're being disingenuous. Don't make your songs sound too R&B," she recalled to CNN. She was asked by a country radio DJ to write songs that reflected "fluffy" and "happy" topics. The stress and anxiety of these instances caused Guyton to develop insomnia and a drinking problem. These conflicts, along with the difficulties of establishing an identity at Capitol Records, caused her music releases to be delayed by several years. In 2014, Capitol Nashville released Gruyton's first extended play (EP), an acoustic album titled Unbreakable. The EP charted on the Billboard Top Heatseekers list after its release, reaching number 14.

In 2015, Capitol released Guyton's debut single, "Better Than You Left Me". Guyton co-wrote the song with Jennifer Hanson, Jen Schott, and Nathan Chapman, the last of whom co-produced it with Dann Huff. The song received 79 ads to radio playlists in its first week of release, which had not been previously done. The Guardian made note of the song's early success on the charts, particularly in relation to Guyton's being a Black female in a genre dominated by white men. By July 2015, the song had reached number 34 on the Billboard Country Airplay chart. It reached a similar peak position on Canada's Billboard country chart. According to Guyton, the song's minimal chart success was due to radio programmers stating "they didn't want two slow songs by women on the radio at the same time." In May 2015, Guyton's self-titled second EP was released on Capitol and contained the minor hit. The EP reached number 17 on the Billboard Heatseekers list by August. The project received a four star rating from Queens of Country, who praised Guyton's vocals and mix of different musical stylings. Guyton also joined Brad Paisley's Crushin' It World Tour in summer 2015.

2016–present: Musical shifts and "Black Like Me"
In 2016, Guyton was nominated for New Female Vocalist of the Year at the 51st Academy of Country Music Awards. That year she also released her next single, "Heartbreak Song". The song reached number 45 on the Country Airplay chart. She continued releasing singles on Capitol such as "Hold On", "Sister", and a cover of Patsy Cline's "Crazy". Entertainment writer Emily Yahr described Guyton's 2016–19 releases as having "heavily-produced" arrangements that seemed to lack a musical direction. These singles also had little commercial success. According to Guyton, she was not going by her own musical instincts. "I was trying so hard to fit into the stereotype of what country music is, that I forgot why I fell in love with country music," she told The Washington Post in 2020. Instead, she began moving away from what was considered safe for country performers: "I did Nashville the Nashville way for so long, and I had seen so many women do Nashville the Nashville way, with very little results."

In 2019, Guyton chose to write music that reflected more of her struggles as a black woman. In early 2020, she released a single that came from those songwriting sessions titled "What Are You Gonna Tell Her?" During this period she also wrote the song "Black Like Me". Based on the book of the same name, the song described Guyton's experiences with racial discrimination. The song was largely ignored by commercial country music radio, but received significant attention via social media platforms and streaming services, with Spotify including "Black Like Me" on their "Hot Country Playlist". Critics also took notice of the track. John Blake of CNN called it "a three-and-a-half-minute song that flipped the good ol' boy patriotism of country music on its side and forced listeners to consider a different perspective." Jewly Hight of NPR praised Guyton's blend of country, gospel and pop vocal styles. The song was since nominated for Best Country Solo Performance at the 63rd Annual Grammy Awards. The Grammy nomination made Guyton the first black female artist to be nominated in the country category.

Soon after "Black Like Me", Guyton became the first black female artist to perform at the Academy of Country Music awards. In September 2020, Guyton released her third EP titled Bridges. The project featured her two previous singles and her third 2020 single, "Heaven Down Here". Four of its six tracks were "sobering personal testimonies", according to Taste of Country. Nashville Scene had similar comments on the song selection: "The fact that a mainstream country artist can spend four tracks of six on an EP talking about anything other than breakups and beer is remarkable." Bridges peaked at number 23 on the Billboard Heatseekers album chart in September 2020. In November 2020, she collaborated on the single "Boys" with Canadian country singer Dean Brody. The song reached number one on the Canada Country singles chart, giving Guyton her first career chart-topper, and making her the first black woman to top the Canada Country chart.

In 2021, Guyton co-hosted the Academy of Country Music Awards with Keith Urban, becoming the first black woman to host the ceremony. 

In an interview with The New Yorker, Guyton revealed the release of her the debut studio album called Remember Her Name. She described the album as a look into her ten years living in Nashville, with songs directly addressing experiences of sexism and racism. The album was released on September 24. Included on the album are "Black Like Me", a re-recording of "Better Than You Left Me", and a cover of Beyoncé's "If I Were a Boy". Rating it 3.5 out of 5 stars, Stephen Thomas Erlewine of AllMusic wrote that "Guyton's specific experiences of being a Black woman in country music are a distinctly American experience, and those struggles inform the heartbreaking 'What Are You Gonna Tell Her' and rousing title track. A good portion of the record is devoted to lighter songs of love, dancing, and drinking -- the topics that are country music's bread and butter -- and they showcase Guyton's versatility as a singer". He concluded that " If the bombast and ballads flatten the production of Remember Her Name somewhat, it nevertheless feels genuine, not calculated. Guyton is broadening and expanding the genre-bending sounds of 1990s country-pop".

On February 13, 2022, Guyton  performed the National Anthem at Super Bowl LVI. In August 2022, Guyton collaborated with Florida Georgia Line's Tyler Hubbard to record the song "Somethin' Bout You".

Musical styles and influences
Guyton's musical style has been described as being rooted in country music, but also in its sub-genres and other musical sectors. In describing her 2020 musical efforts, NPR's Jewly Hight observed a mixture of country, pop, gospel, R&B and hip hop. Mike Collar of Allmusic found that Guyton has "a warm, textured voice, whose sound walks the line between classic country and contemporary pop." Guyton explained that her musical style contains elements of pop, but is mostly rooted in country. Her musical approach was taken from early influences such as Dolly Parton, who she got to meet in 2017. "She came up in a time that was extremely conservative but she had such progressive views. She taught people to love for who they are no matter what and I think that's amazing," she told Country Music Television. Guyton was also heavily influenced by LeAnn Rimes and her 1996 album Blue. Rimes' music helped Guyton discover other female country performers, including Patsy Cline, Patty Loveless, Reba McEntire, and Martina McBride. "I was just mesmerized by big-voiced women," she recalled. Guyton also credits BeBe & CeCe Winans and Whitney Houston as musical influences.

Personal life
Guyton began a relationship with lawyer Grant Savoy in 2010. In November 2016, the couple announced their engagement. In June 2017, the couple wed in Kauai, Hawaii alongside 23 friends and family members. In August 2020, Guyton announced that she was pregnant with the couple's first child. In February 2021, she gave birth to a son whom the couple named Grayson.

Discography

 Remember Her Name (2021)

Filmography

Awards and nominations

!
|-
| 2015
| 51st Annual Academy of Country Music Awards
| New Female Vocalist of the Year
| 
| align="center"| 
|-
| 2020
| 63rd Annual Grammy Awards
| Best Country Solo Performance – "Black Like Me"
| 
| align="center"| 
|-
| rowspan=2| 2021
| 56th Academy of Country Music Awards
| New Female Artist of the Year
| 
| align="center"| 
|-
| 55th Annual Country Music Association Awards
| New Artist of the Year
| 
| align="center"| 
|-
| rowspan=6| 2022
| rowspan=3| 64th Annual Grammy Awards
| Best Country Album – Remember Her Name
| 
| align="center" rowspan="3"| 
|-
| Best Country Song – "Remember Her Name"
| 
|-
| Best Country Solo Performance – "Remember Her Name"
| 
|-
| rowspan=3| CMT Music Awards
| Video of the Year – "Remember Her Name"
| 
| align="center" rowspan=3| 
|-
| Female Video of the Year – "Remember Her Name"
| 
|-
| CMT Performance of the Year – "Friendship Train" (with Gladys Knight and Breland)
| 
|}

References

External links

1983 births
21st-century African-American musicians
21st-century African-American people
21st-century African-American women singers
21st-century American singers
21st-century American women singers
African-American country musicians
African-American women singer-songwriters
American country singer-songwriters
American Idol participants
American women country singers
Capitol Records artists
Country musicians from Texas
Living people
People from Arlington, Texas
Singer-songwriters from Texas